Tryggvaflokkr (the "Flokkr-poem of Tryggvi") was an Old Norse poem about Tryggve the Pretender, an 11th-century Viking chieftain who purported to be the son of Olaf Tryggvason and tried to conquer Norway in 1033. It is usually attributed to Sighvat Thordarson, a skald and court poet of Canute the Great. The only surviving portion of the poem is that quoted by Snorri Sturluson in the Heimskringla:

Notes

References
Snorri Sturluson. Heimskringla: History of the Kings of Norway. Lee Hollander, transl. Univ. of Texas Press, 2002.

Skaldic poems
11th-century poems